The Sesia (Latin Sesites or Sessites) is a river in Piedmont, north-western Italy, tributary to the Po.

Geography
Its sources are the glaciers of Monte Rosa at the border with Switzerland. It flows through the Alpine valley Valsesia and the towns Varallo Sesia, Quarona, Borgosesia and Vercelli. The Sesia flows into the Po River near Casale Monferrato.

Main tributaries 

 Left hand tributaries:
 Sermenza,
 Mastallone,
 Pascone,
 Strona di Valduggia.
 Right hand tributaries:
 Sorba,
 Sessera,
 Cervo,
 Naviglio di Ivrea,
 Bona,
 Marcova,
 Roggia Stura.

Sport and leisure
It is a popular river for kayaking and hosted the European championship in 2001 and the world championship in 2002.

See also
 Sesia (département), First French Empire

References

External links 
Photos

Rivers of Italy
Rivers of the Province of Novara
Rivers of the Province of Vercelli
Rivers of the Province of Alessandria
Rivers of the Province of Pavia
Rivers of the Alps
Braided rivers in Italy